A slant board is a flat surface set at an angle or slant. Such boards may be used for a variety of purposes.

Movies
Movie studios provide them for actors to rest on between performances to avoid wrinkling costumes.

Exercise
There are two varieties for exercises:
 a long padded board which will accommodate the full length of the lying body
 a smaller wooden platform for standing upon.

The calf muscles or triceps surae may be stretched by a daily exercise of standing upon a slant board.

References

Exercise equipment